Ophioglossum lusitanicum, the least adder's-tongue, is a small fern of the family Ophioglossaceae. It is a pan-tropically species categorised as least concern by the IUCN (2001).

Description
Ophioglossum lusitanicum is a small winter annual fern, and consists of a simple sterile blade attached to a spike-like fertile blade with between three and eight sunken sporangia on either side. The whole plant rarely exceeds a height of 2 cm.

This species has a chromosome number of 2n = 250–260.

Distribution
Ophioglossum lusitanicum is native to regions bordering the eastern North Atlantic Ocean in Mauritania, Macaronesia (excluding Cape Verde), Morocco, Portugal, France up to the Isles of Scilly and Channel Islands; all countries bordering the Mediterranean; the Caucasus region and has some records in India and Vietnam.

The distribution in Britain is restricted to one small area of coastal heath on St Agnes, Isles of Scilly where it was discovered by John Raven in 1950. It grows in short turf on Wingletang Down where some of the colonies are suffering from an increase of competitive grasses, gorse (Ulex europaeus) and bramble (Rubus fruticosus). Ophioglossum lusitanicum is listed on Schedule 8 of the Wildlife and Countryside Act 1981, and is within a Site of Special Scientific Interest (SSSI).

In Australasia and South America, this species is represented by a subspecies, Ophioglossum lusitanicum subsp. coriaceum (A. Cunn.) R.T. Clausen

Ecology
As this species is a winter annual, it requires a warm winter environment. In its British populations, it favours thin, unshaded, peaty soils in south-facing localities.

Ophioglossum lusitanicum subsp. coriaceum has a much broader ecological range in southern Australia, where habitats include damp open sites; from coast meadows to alpine grassland. It is found in New South Wales, Tasmania, Queensland, and other states.

Taxonomy
Linnaeus was the first to describe least adder's-tongue with the binomial Ophioglossum lusitanicum in his Species Plantarum of 1753.

References

External links

 "The Ferns (Filicopsida) of the British Isles" — Ophioglossum lusitanicum 
 Future is written in green: detailed photos of Ophioglossum lusitanicum 
 Naturalengland.org.uk: Wingletang Downs SSSI citation
 BSBI Maps: Map showing distribution of Ophioglossum lusitanicum in the British Isles

lusitanicum
Ferns of the Americas
Ferns of Asia
Ferns of Australasia
Ferns of Europe
Ferns of Argentina
Ferns of New Zealand
Flora of the Canary Islands
Flora of Cape Verde
Flora of Iran
Flora of Israel
Flora of Lebanon
Flora of New South Wales
Flora of Palestine (region)
Flora of Peru
Flora of Portugal
Flora of Spain
Flora of England
Plants described in 1753
Vulnerable plants
Taxa named by Carl Linnaeus